Harold Samuel Kushner (born April 3, 1935) is a prominent American rabbi and author. He is a member of the Rabbinical Assembly of Conservative Judaism and served as the congregational rabbi of Temple Israel of Natick, in Natick, Massachusetts, for 24 years. His 14 books include the best-sellers When Bad Things Happen to Good People and Living a Life That Matters: Resolving the Conflict Between Conscience and Success.

Education 
Born in Brooklyn, Kushner graduated from Columbia University in 1955 and later obtained his rabbinical ordination from the Jewish Theological Seminary (JTS) in 1960. The same institution awarded him a doctoral degree in 1972. Kushner has also studied at the Hebrew University of Jerusalem, taught at Clark University and the Rabbinical School of the JTS, and received six honorary doctorates.

Congregational Rabbi 
He served as the congregational rabbi of Temple Israel of Natick, in Natick, Massachusetts, for 24 years and belongs to the Rabbinical Assembly.

Author 
He is the author of a best selling book on the problem of evil, When Bad Things Happen to Good People. Written following the death of his son, Aaron, from the premature aging disease progeria, the book deals with questions about human suffering, God, omnipotence and theodicy. Aaron was born in 1963 and died in 1977; the book was published in 1981.

Kushner has written a number of other popular theological books, such as How Good Do We Have to Be? (Dedicated to his grandson, Carl), To Life! and many others. In collaboration with the late Chaim Potok, Kushner co-edited Etz Hayim: A Torah Commentary, the new official Torah commentary of the Conservative movement, which was jointly published in 2001 by the Rabbinical Assembly and the Jewish Publication Society. His Living a Life That Matters became a best seller in the fall of 2001. Kushner's book, The Lord Is My Shepherd, was a meditation on the Twenty-Third Psalm released in 2003. Kushner also wrote a response to Simon Wiesenthal's question of forgiveness in the book The Sunflower: On the Possibilities and Limits of Forgiveness.

List of publications 
 Nine Essential Things I've Learned about Life, published in 2015
 The Book of Job: When Bad Things Happened to a Good Person published in October 2012
 Conquering Fear: Living Boldly in an Uncertain World Published in 2009, is a theological piece that addresses fears of terrorism, natural disasters, rejection, growing old and offer suggestions on how best to cope, ultimately living with purpose and differentiating between God and nature.
 Faith & Family: Favorite Sermons of Rabbi Harold S. Kushner published in October 2007
 Practice Random Acts of Kindness: Bring More Peace, Love, And Compassion published in 2007
 Overcoming Life's Disappointments published in 2006
 The Lord Is My Shepherd: Healing Wisdom of the 23rd Psalm published in 2003
 Who Needs God published in 1989
 Living a Life That Matters: Resolving the Conflict Between Conscience and Success published in 2001
 How Good Do We Have to Be? A New Understanding of Guilt and Forgiveness published in 1997
 When Children Ask About God: A Guide for Parents Who Don't Always Have All the Answers published in 1995
 To Life: A Celebration of Jewish Being and Thinking published in 1994
 When All You've Ever Wanted Isn't Enough: The Search for a Life That Matters published in 1986
 When Bad Things Happen to Good People published in 1981

Miscellaneous 
 Kushner offered a reading from the Bible at the State Funeral of Ronald Reagan in the Washington National Cathedral on June 11, 2004.
 In 2007 Rabbi Kushner was given the Lifetime Achievement Award by the Jewish Book Council.

References

External links 
 Rabbi Kushner's bio at Temple Israel
 Rabbi Harold Kushner talks and gives stories in relation to his latest book Overcoming Life's Disappointments (video)
 
 
 

1935 births
Living people
American Humanistic Jews
Jewish humanists
20th-century American rabbis
21st-century American rabbis
American Conservative rabbis
 Humanistic rabbis
American Jewish theologians
Process theologians
Jewish American writers
Jewish Theological Seminary of America semikhah recipients
Columbia College (New York) alumni
Hebrew University of Jerusalem alumni
People from Brooklyn
People from Greater Boston
Erasmus Hall High School alumni